The Silpathorn Award, is an honour for living Thai contemporary artists presented annually by the Office of Contemporary Art and Culture, Ministry of Culture of Thailand. The awards were established in 2004 to promote Thai contemporary artists who are considered to be in their mid-career and who have already made notable contributions to Thai fine arts and culture.

Artists are honored in the fields of visual arts, literature, music, film, performing arts, design and architecture.

History
Education and promotion of fine arts in the Kingdom of Thailand was under the auspices of the Department of Fine Arts of the Ministry of Palace Affairs. In 1943, the department's schools became Silpakorn University, founded by Silpa Bhirasri, an Italian sculptor who was named Corrado Feroci, but became a Thai citizen during World War II and is considered the father of fine arts in Thailand.
 
Other offices promoting fine arts included the Office of the National Culture Commission and the Religious Affairs Department.

In 1985, the Office of the National Culture Commission established the Thailand National Artist designation, which is conferred on notable Thai artists as a lifetime achievement award.

The Office of Contemporary Art and Culture (OCAC), under the Ministry of Culture, was formed in 2001 and was tasked with supporting, and promoting contemporary art and culture. While the National Artist programme has been generally aimed at veteran artists, especially those in the areas of Thai traditional arts, the OCAC recognised that younger artists needed support, promotion and recognition as well. In 2004, the Silpathorn Award was created, with honorees in the fields of visual art, literature, music, film and performing arts. In 2008, an award for the field of design was added.

Qualifications
Silpathorn Award honorees must meet the following qualifications:
Thai nationals.
Between the ages 30 to 50 years and still alive on the announcement day.
Their works have continually been exposed to the general public until present.
Their works have been released in Thailand and have made a great impact on Thai contemporary art and inspired young artists.

Silpathorn Kitikhun award
In 2008, a Distinguished ("Kitikhun") category was created for senior artists over 50 years of age who, because of controversy or unconventional works, would likely never be considered for the more conservative Thailand National Artist honor.  At first this category was known in English as the "Honorary" category, but the translation was changed to "Distinguished" at the time the awards were actually given.  This is because it was felt that in English an "honorary" award might be considered to be less "real" whereas the intent of the committee was to create a senior grade of the award.

Definition of Silpathorn
Silpathorn in Thai language is a combination of two words: "Silpa", meaning "Art", and "Thorn" (or "Torn"), meaning "the Upholder", thus Silpathorn means "Upholder of Art".

Silpathorn brooch, cash prize
The Silpathorn Award is in the form of a brooch, modeled on the emblem of the Office of Contemporary Art and Culture, and made of white and yellow gold and decorated with diamonds and emeralds.

List of Silpathorn Award winners

 Design award initiated in 2008.
 Architecture award initiated in 2010.

List of Distinguished ("Kitikhun") Silpathorn Award winners
The Distinguished Silpathorn Award was created in 2008.

2008
S. P. Somtow, composer, conductor and author
Saiyart Semangern, designer
Suwan Kongkhuntien, designer

2009
Bruce Gaston, composer and musician

2010
No honorees named

See also
S.E.A. Write Award
Thailand National Artist
Cinema of Thailand
Culture of Thailand
Dance of Thailand
Music of Thailand

References

External links
Thailand Office of Contemporary Art and Culture government website

Thai awards
 01
Thai art
Visual arts awards
Dance awards
Thai literary awards
Awards established in 2004
2004 establishments in Thailand